Duddepudi is a village in Konijerla mandal, Khammam district, Telangana, India.

Demographics
 Census of India, Duddepudi had a population of 1,559. There are about 485 families residing in the village according to the census 2011.

References

Villages in Khammam district